Mossy Creek is a stream in Benton County in the U.S. state of Missouri. It is a tributary to the Osage River within the Lake of the Ozarks.

Mossy Creek was so named on account of wetlands along its course.

See also
List of rivers of Missouri

References

Rivers of Benton County, Missouri
Rivers of Missouri